Nikolai Müllerschön is a German film Writer/Director.

He was born in 1958 in Stuttgart, West Germany and moved to Munich in 1968. He has lived in Los Angeles since 1992.

He started as a Stills Photographer, worked as Continuity-Supervisor, Assistant Cameraman, Sound-Engineer, Assistant Director, Director of Photography on Documentary Films, Commercials, Industrial Films, Television-Films/Features and Theatrical Feature Films in Europe, the US and Asia.
First Feature as Director 1979.
Worked as Screenwriter, Creative Producer and Director on Theatrical Features, TV-Features, Mini-Series and TV-Drama-Series.

He is sometimes credited as Niki Müllerschön.

Filmography

Television

Director
2014: Last Exit Sauerland, TV-Feature
2013: Almuth und Rita, TV-Feature
2012: Hochzeiten Zwei (AT), ARD, TV-Feature
2012: Hochzeiten, ARD, TV-Feature
2011: Doppelgängerin, ARD, TV-Feature
2010: Aber jetzt erst recht, ARD, TV-Feature
2009: Kathi, ARD, TV-Feature.
2005: Five Stars, ZDF, pilot and 4 episodes, drama mini series
2005: Mutter aus heiterem Himmel, Sat.1, TV-Feature
2003-2004: Die Verbrechen des Professor Capellari, 3 two-hour episodes
1999: Paul and Clara, Sat.1, TV-Feature. Love/Drama.
1998: Der Erlkönig – Auf der Jagd nach dem Auto von morgen, ProSieben, TV-Feature. Action/Thriller.
1998: Freunde fürs Leben, ZDF, Mini-series, pilot and 2 episodes. Family Soap.
1997: Rape, TV Event-Movie,  RTL (aired 1997, best ratings of week - total, 17th best ratings of year at network - TV-movies). Drama/Thriller.
1997: Revenge, Sat.1, TV-event movie, (aired in 1997, 2nd best ratings / day – all networks, best/week for network). Drama/Thriller.
1996: The Girl's the Witness, Sat.1, TV-Feature, 16mm, color, 104 minutes, (aired 1997,  2nd best ratings/day all networks). Crime/Thriller.
1995: Hals über Kopf, ProSieben, TV-Feature, 16mm, color, 96 minutes. Chosen Best German TV - Program (crime/Thriller) by European TV Festival. Crime/Thriller/Comedy.
1994: Alles außer Mord, ProSieben, TV-Feature. 16 mm, color, 96 minutes. Crime/Thriller/Comedy.
1994: Der Gletscher Clan, ProSieben, mini-series. Nominated for GRIMME-PREIS 1995. 6 episodes (48 minutes). Drama.
1993: Der Gletscher Clan, ProSieben, mini-series. 1 Pilot (94 minutes)  and 7 episodes (48 minutes). Drama.
1992: Der Millionär, ARD, TV-Series. 16mm, color 28 minutes. 4 episodes. Drama/Thriller.
1991: Der Sturm, BR, TV-Mini-Series. 16mm, color. 6 episodes (30 minutes). Drama/Documentary.
1990/91: Inside Bunte, ProSieben, Creation/Design/Creative Producer. RTL Magazine Show.
1988/89: Die glückliche Familie, ZDF. 16mm, color. 10 episodes (50 minutes). Family Soap.
1988: Bubbles, Feature. Several TV-screenings, shown at "Children’s Film Festival". Children/Comedy.

Writer
2012: Hochzeiten Zwei, TV-Feature
2012: Hochzeiten, ARD, TV-Feature
2011: Doppelgängerin, TV-Feature
2010: Aber jetzt erst recht, TV-Feature
2009: Kathi, ARD, TV-Feature. 
2001-2002: Die Verbrechen des Professor Capellari, four two hour episodes.
1998: Chasing Tales, TV-Feature, Romantic Comedy (in development for PRO7).
1998: Freunde fürs Leben,  ZDF. TV-Series – Drama. Writer,  Co-Creator of new release, 5 episodes.
1996: The King, ZDF. TV-Feature - Thriller/Drama. Writer.
1996: Revenge, RTL. TV-Feature - Thriller/Drama. Creator / Writer.
1996: 60 Minuten Angst, Sat.1. TV-Feature- Thriller/Drama. Creator / Writer.
1995: The Girl's the Witness, Sat.1.  TV-Feature Thriller/Drama. Co-Writer.
1995: Desperate Measures, Theatrical Feature, 96 minutes. Idea by.
1993: The Glacier Clan, ProSieben. TV Mini-series - Drama/Comedy. 6 Episodes. Creator / Writer/Creative Producer.
1992/93: The Glacier Clan, ProSieben.  TV- Mini-series - Drama / Comedy. Pilot / 7 episodes. Co-creator/Co-writer/Director/Creative Producer. 
1990/91: Inside Bunte, ProSieben.  TV-Magazine. Creator, Writer, Creative Producer.

Short films
Der Wettkampf, 1984. 35mm, color, 12 minutes.

Awards
"HARMS": Best Leading Actor (Heiner Lauterbach) at Tirana International Film Festival 2013
“THE RED BARON”: Platinum Remi Award  for Best Action Adventure Theatrical Feature at 43rd Annual Worldfest Houston International Film Festival 2010
“THE RED BARON”: Best Feature Film at DELRAY BEACH FILM 2010
"OPERATION DEAD END": Nominated Best Picture at Sidges Film Festival/Spain in 1986. (Written and directed by NM)
"OPERATION DEAD END": Awarded "Besonders Wertvoll" in 1986. (Written and directed by NM)
"DER WETTKAMPF": Awarded  "Best Theatrical Short" in 1985. (Written and directed by NM)
"HALS ÜBER KOPF": Awarded Best TV-Feature (Crime/Thriller) by "European TV Festival" in 1996. (Directed by NM)
"GLACIER CLAN": Nominated for "GRIMME PREIS in 1995. (13 episodes & pilot, co-written, written and directed by NM)

References

External links
 

Mass media people from Munich
German emigrants to the United States
Living people
Movie stills photographers
Year of birth missing (living people)